Petr Mikhaylovich Fradkov (born 1978) is a Russian economist and banker serving as the chairman and CEO of Promsvyazbank and the general director of the .

On 28 February 2022, in relation to the 2022 Russian invasion of Ukraine, the European Union blacklisted him, imposing an EU-wide travel ban and freezing all his assets.

Early life and education 
Fradkov was born in 1978 in Moscow. He is the son of Mikhail Fradkov. Fradkov graduated from the Moscow State Institute of International Relations in 2000. In 2007, he earned a Master of Business Administration (MBA) from the Kingston Business School. Fradkov completed a second MBA and a  degree at the Russian Presidential Academy of National Economy and Public Administration.

Career 
Fradkov joined the VEB.RF in 2000 working as a deputy representative in the United States. In 2004, he was the deputy director general of the Far Eastern Shipping Company. Fradkov returned to VEB in 2007. In 2011, Fradkov became the head of EXIAR.

In 2018, Fradkov was appointed head of the Promsvyazbank (PSB) with Dmitri Pozhidaev serving as his deputy. Since 2018, Fradkov has worked to transform PSB into a bank that services the defense industry and supports state defense contracts. In his role as chairman and CEO of PSB, Fradkov has held working meetings with Vladimir Putin and participated in roundtable discussions in international forums in which he forecasts the PSB's long-term strategic plans for supporting the Russian defense industry.

In November 2020, Fradkov became lead of the Chuvash Regional Branch of SoyuzMash.

On February 22, 2022, U.S. president Joe Biden signed  sanctioning Fradkov for operating or having operated in the defense and related materiel and financial services sectors of the Russian Federation economy. He was sanctioned by the British government on 24 February 2022 for his role as CEO of Promsvyazbank.

Personal life 
Fradkov is married to Victoria Igorevna Fradkova. She is a lecturer in the department of international relations and the foreign policy of Russia at the Moscow State Institute of International Relations. They have a daughter.

US Sanctions in 2022 
The U.S. Treasury imposed personal economic sanctions on Petr Fradkov in response to actions in the Donetsk and Luhansk regions by the Promsvyazbank, where he is Chairman and CEO.

Awards and honors 
Fradkov received a Medal of the Order "For Merit to the Fatherland" Level II.

References

External links

 

1978 births
Living people
Businesspeople from Moscow
Petr
Russian bankers
Russian oligarchs
Moscow State Institute of International Relations alumni
Alumni of Kingston University
Russian Presidential Academy of National Economy and Public Administration alumni
Academic staff of the Higher School of Economics
Recipients of the Medal of the Order "For Merit to the Fatherland" II class
Russian individuals subject to the U.S. Department of the Treasury sanctions
Russian individuals subject to European Union sanctions
Specially Designated Nationals and Blocked Persons List
21st-century Russian economists
21st-century Russian businesspeople